Soap Opera Weekly was a weekly magazine covering American daytime soap operas. It featured onscreen and offscreen news about the series, interviews with and articles about performers, storyline summaries and analysis, and related promotional information. Launched in November 1989 by News Corporation with Mimi Torchin as editor-in-chief, Weekly began as a sister magazine to Soap Opera Digest. News Corporation sold the magazine to K-III in 1991. K-III was renamed Primedia, and sold its magazines to Source Interlink in 2007.

American Media, Inc. took over Source Interlink's soap magazines in 2011; Soap Opera Weekly ceased publication in 2012.

References

External links

See also
 Soap Opera Digest
 Soap Opera Magazine
 Soap Opera Update
 Soaps In Depth

Defunct magazines published in the United States
Magazines about soap operas
Magazines established in 1989
Magazines disestablished in 2012
Magazines published in New York City
Weekly magazines published in the United States